Prince Vasily Vladimirovich Dolgorukov (c. January 1667 – 11 February 1746, Saint Petersburg) was a Russian commander and politician, promoted to Field Marshal (генерал-фельдмаршал) in 1728. His life and fortune swung like a weather vane, due to complex plots and the troubled time following Peter the Great's death.

Life
Son of a boyar, Vasili Dolgorukov was, starting from 1685, a stolnik at the royal court. He was then enlisted in the Preobrazhensky regiment in 1700, starting his true military career.

Serving in the Preobrazhensky regiment, he took part in Russian Northern Wars and distinguished himself during the siege of Mitava in 1705. In 1706, he was transferred to Ukraine, where he was under the command of Ivan Mazepa, where he distinguished himself in 1707–1708 during the squelching of the Bulavin Rebellion. During the Battle of Poltava he was the commander of the reserve cavalry force. In 1715, he was sent to Poland as a represent of Peter (who was ill at that time), where he concluded, in 1716, a pact with Danzig, forcing the city into an anti-Swedish policy. He also accompanied Peter the Great during his foreign travels in 1717 and 1718.

Despite being a favorite of Peter the Great, Dolgorukov disapproved a number of Peter's reforms, and eventually became a partisan of tsarevich Alexei Petrovich. In 1718, following Alexei's trial and death, Dolgorukov reproached Peter such a violent behavior towards his own son. Dolgorukov was tried, demoted and exiled to Solikamsk.

Following Catherine I's coronation on 7 May 1724. Dolgorukov was brought back from his exile and given the rank of colonel and then brigadier. In 1726, he was appointed commander-in-chief of Caucasus forces. In 1728, as an ultimate consecration of his military career, he was promoted field marshal and member of the Supreme Privy Council.

After Anna Ioanovna's coronation in 1730, Dolgoroukov was appointed to Senate and made president of College of War. However, reportedly made insulting remarks regarding persecutions staged by Anna against his family. In 1731, after a complex plot, he was accused of insulting remarks regarding the Empress and sentenced to death. His sentence was changed to life imprisonment first in Schlisselburg fortress, then in Ivangorod in 1737, and finally he was exiled for life to the Solovetsky Monastery in 1739.

In December 1741, following Elizabeth's coronation, Dorgorukov was brought back from his exile and fully rehabilitated. Elizabeth named him president of the College of War, a rank that he assumed until his death. While serving in the War College, Dolgoroukov made significant improvements regarding the organization and logistics of Russian military.

References
 Soviet military encyclopedia
 Bantysh-Kamensky, Biographies of Russian generalissimes and field marshals, Moscow, 1991.
 Brockhaus and Efron Encyclopedic Dictionary

1667 births
1746 deaths
Field marshals of Russia
Vasily Vladimirovich
Recipients of the Order of St. George of the Third Degree
18th-century military personnel from the Russian Empire
Imperial Russian Army generals
Russian military personnel of the Great Northern War
Members of the Supreme Privy Council
Burials at the Annunciation Church of the Alexander Nevsky Lavra
Recipients of the Order of the White Eagle (Poland)